Rock 'n' Country is an album by Freddy Fender that was released in 1976.

Track listing
"Vaya con Dios" (Buddy Pepper, Inez James, Larry Russell)
"You'll Lose a Good Thing" (Barbara Lynn Ozen, Huey P. Meaux)
"I Need You So" (Tommy McLain)
"Mathilda" (George Khoury, Huey Thierry)
"My Happiness" (Betty Peterson, Borney Bergantine)
"Just Out of Reach of My Two Open Arms" (Virgil F. Stewart)
"The Rains Came" (Huey P. Meaux)
"Take Her a Message! I'm Lonely" (Baldemar Huerta)
"Since I Met You Baby" (Ivory Joe Hunter)
"Big Boss Man" (Al Smith, Luther Dixon)
"I Can't Help It If I'm Still in Love With You" (Hank Williams)

Charts

Personnel
Freddy Fender - guitar, vocals
Bill Ham, Bobby Neal, Eddie Nation, Russell McNeely - guitar
Evan Arredondo, Ira Wilkes, Jimmy Jones, Keith Grimwood - bass
"Uncle" Mick Moody - steel guitar
"Fiddlin'" Frenchie Bourke - fiddle
Bruce Ewen, Leo O'Neil, Michael Red Young - piano
Bob Taylor, Dahrell Norriss, Randy Reeves - drums

References 

Freddy Fender albums
1976 albums
Dot Records albums